Tabernaemontana linkii is a species of plant in the family Apocynaceae. It is found in northern and western South America.

References

linkii